Kontraktova Ploshcha is a station on Kyiv Metro's Obolonsko–Teremkivska Line. The station was opened on 17 December 1976, and is named after Kyiv's Kontraktova Square (Contract's Square) in the historic Podil neighborhood. It was designed by B.I. Pryimak, I.K. Maslenynkov, and F.M. Zaremba. The station was formerly known as Chervona Ploscha until 1990.

The station is located shallow underground and consists of a central hall with columns. The columns and the walls along the tracks have been covered with green-brown coloured marble. Passenger tunnels connect the station to the Kontraktova Square and another street. The station hall has two exits, one of which is equipped with escalators. The exits branch further into the system of 4 elaborated underpasses, covering several city blocks.

Gallery

External links
 Kyivsky Metropoliten — Station description and photographs 
 Metropoliten.kiev.ua — Station description and photographs 

Kyiv Metro stations
Railway stations opened in 1976
1976 establishments in Ukraine